Charles Arthur Morris  (1860–1942), was a British surgeon to the King Edward VII's Hospital for Officers during the Boer War in South Africa. In 1914 he was on the list of honorary medical staff at the hospital, compiled by Sister Agnes, with whom he was good friends, and served at the hospital during the First World War.

References

1860 births
1942 deaths
British surgeons
King Edward VII's Hospital